Sir Herbert Frank Cobbold Ereaut (6 May 1919 – 11 September 1998) was Bailiff of Jersey from 1975 to 1985.
Sir Peter Crill was appointed Deputy Bailiff in 1974 and then succeeded Sir Frank Ereaut as Bailiff of Jersey in January 1986.

Early years 
Ereaut was born in London, the son of Herbert Parker Ereaut (who predeceased him having been killed in active service in 1918) and May Julia Cobbold. Ereaut was the grandson of James J Ereaut, a Connétable of St Saviour.

Ereaut was educated at Victoria College Prep School in Jersey, Tormore Preparatory School in Deal and Cranleigh School. He was a Kitchener Scholar at Exeter College, Oxford. During the Second World War, he served in the Royal Army Service Corps, attaining the rank of captain.

Legal career 
Ereaut was called to the English and Jersey Bars in 1947.

He was appointed HM Solicitor General in 1958 and HM Attorney General in 1962. Appointment as Deputy Bailiff came in 1969 and he became Bailiff of Jersey in 1975, succeeding Sir Robert Le Masurier. His time as a Crown Officer coincided with Jersey's negotiations with the United Kingdom Government about the constitutional implications for Jersey of the United Kingdom's accession to the European Economic Community.

He was described as 'the gentlest of gentlemen'.

Honours 
Ereaut was knighted in 1976.

Personal life 
Ereaut married Kay Fitzgibbon from County Cork. They had one daughter. In February 1986, he was appointed a director of Standard Chartered Bank (CI).

External links 
 Profile on Guernsey Society website http://www.guernsey-society.org.uk/donkipedia/index.php5?title=Frank_Ereaut

References
Who's Who in the Channel Islands 1967 (Jersey: Channel Island Publishing Co Ltd, 1967)

Law
Jersey lawyers
Military personnel from London
Knights Bachelor
Lawyers awarded knighthoods
1919 births
1998 deaths
People educated at Cranleigh School
20th-century British lawyers
British Army personnel of World War II
Royal Army Service Corps officers